Becamex  is a multidisciplinary corporation whose headquarters is located in Bình Dương Province. The corporation also bears the mark of Binh Duong, a key industrial area of the country.

History

Becamex IDC was founded in 1976 under the name of Bến Cát General Trade Company (Becamex) featuring trading market, agricultural good production, good distribution,...

In 1992, with the approval of People's Committee of Sông Bé Province, Bến Cát General Trade Company was incorporated into a Province-rank company (under the management of Sông Bé Province People's Committee), and its official name was changed to Sông Bé Province Trade, Import and Export Company.

After Bình Dương Province was split from Sông Bé Province in 1997, to follow the new economic trend and show off their ambition, in 1999 the company changed its name to Trade – Investment and Development Company (BECAMEX Corp).

On 28 April 2006, based on the decision coded 106/2006/QĐ-UBND of Bình Dương Province People's Committee, Industrial Investment and Development Company (Becamex IDC) was formed on Trade – Investment and Development Company with more advanced organization.

On 19 January 2010, Vietnam's Prime Minister Nguyễn Tấn Dũng signed public document number 151/TTg-ĐMDN, which Becamex IDC can operate as a parent-subsidiary company. The parent company is a single-member limited liability company.

As development, the corporation incorporated, invested and founded many daughter companies. Up until now, the corporation has 28 subsidiary members in every aspect.

Organization

Subsidiary Offices
Manufacturing Business Office
Finance Management Office
Technical and Economic Office 
Investment Office
Administrative Organization Office
Marketing Office
Land Management Office
Design Office
IT Office

Subsidiary and Affiliated Companies

Securities – Finance – Insurance – Bank area:
Đệ Nhất Stock Corporation (FSC).
Hùng Vương Share Insurance Company (HKI).

Construction – Trade – Real estate – services area:
Bình Dương Trading Joint Stock Company and Pacific Development (TDC).
Binh Duong Construction & Civil Engineering Joint Stock (BCE). 
JSC Development Infrastructure (Becamex IJC).
Becamex – Bình Phước JSC Development Infrastructure (Becamex – Bình Phước)

Telecommunication – IT area:
Vietnam Technology & Telecommunication JSC (VNTT).

Production area:
Becamex Mineral Joint Stock Company (Becamex BMC). 
Becamex Concrete Joint Stock Company (Becamex ACC). 
Becamex Material Construction Joint Stock Company (Becamex CMC).

Medication area:
Becamex Pharmacy Joint Stock Company (Becamex Pharma). 
SaVi Pharmacy Joint Stock Company (Savipharm).

Health care – Education area:
Mỹ Phước General Hospital. 
Becamex International General Hospital. 
Eastern International University.
Ngô Thời Nhiệm School System.

Industrial and Urban development projects
Vietnam – Singapore Industrial Park (VSIP):
– VSIP I (Thuận An, Bình Dương): was formed on friendship and economic cooperation between Vietnam and Singapore by the first propose of Vietnam's 4th Prime Minister Võ Văn Kiệt to Goh Chok Tong Prime Minister in March 1994. The project was born on 31 January 1996 in Singapore. Then, on 14 May 1996, VSIP I was constructed with the witness of both prime ministers (Võ Văn Kiệt and Goh Chok Tong).

– VSIP II (Binh Duong New City, Bình Dương): constructed in 2005 with 1,850 ha large.

– VSIP – Bắc Ninh (Từ Sơn, Bắc Ninh): constructed in 2007

– VSIP – Hải Phòng (Đình Vũ - Cát Hải Economic Zone, Haiphong): constructed in 2010

– VSIP – Quảng Ngãi (Quảng Ngãi): constructed in 2013

– VSIP – Bình Định (Nhơn Hội Economic Zone, Vân Canh, Bình Định): 2,308 ha large

Mỹ Phước Industrial and Urban areas: 3,429 ha
– Mỹ Phước 1: 400 ha

– Mỹ Phước 2: 800 ha

– Mỹ Phước 3: 2,200 ha

– Mỹ Phước 4 – Thới Hòa Industrial and Urban area: 956 ha

– Mỹ Phước 5 – Bàu Bàng Industrial and Urban area: 2,000 ha

Bình Dương Industrial – Service and Urban Complex (Binh Duong New City): 4,196 ha large
Becamex – Bình Phước Industrial – Urban Complex (Chơn Thành, Bình Phước): 4,300 ha large (with industrial area is 2,448.27 ha)

Achievements
3rd Class Labor Order (1997)
2nd Class Labor Order (1999)
1st Class Labor Order (2000)
3rd Class Independence Order (2009)

References

1976 establishments in Vietnam
Real estate companies established in 1976
Vietnamese companies established in 1976
Health care companies established in 1976
Business services companies established in 1976
Financial services companies established in 1976
Technology companies established in 1976
Transport companies established in 1976
Manufacturing companies established in 1976
Education companies established in 1976